The water polo events at the 1998 World Aquatics Championships were held from 7 to 18 January 1998, in Perth, Western Australia.

Medal summary

Medal table

Medalists

References

 
1998
World Aquatics Championships
Water polo